La Cala Resort is a residential and recreational estate in Mijas, Andalucía, southern Spain. Located between Marbella and Fuengirola, La Cala is home to three 18-hole golf courses, a six-hole Par 3 pitch and putt course, and a golf academy. It is recognised by the Royal Spanish Golf Federation as the largest golf complex in the country. Other facilities include a luxury hotel, on-site apartments and villas, and a separate clubhouse. 

The resort's three 18-hole courses were designed by Cabell B. Robinson, and are named Campo América, Campo Asia and Campo Europa. The complex has staged numerous competitions such as the Ladies European Tour qualifying school and the Spanish Pairs final, won by Miguel Ángel Jiménez and Andrés Jiménez. In September 2008 the resort hosted the Ladbrokescasino.com Masters. In July 2007 La Cala set a Guinness World Record for the largest number of golfers to compete in a one-day event in a resort, when 614 people played in a competition held to raise funds for UNICEF. 

The main shareholder in the resort is the Irish insurance company FBD Holdings.

References

External links
 

Golf clubs and courses in Spain
Hotels in Spain
Sports venues in Andalusia